Dylan Fawsitt (born July 24, 1990) is an Irish-born American rugby union player who plays as a hooker for Rugby New York (Ironworkers) in Major League Rugby (MLR) and also for the United States men's national team. His nickname is "The Butcher".

Fawsitt previously played for the Glendale Raptors and the Ohio Aviators. Prior to moving to the United States in 2014, Fawsitt played rugby for Greystones, Blackrock College, and St. Mary's College in Ireland. In addition to his playing career, Fawsitt coaches rugby at Monroe College and Fordham Preparatory School in New York City.

Early life
Fawsitt grew up in Ireland and moved to Wicklow at the age of 10. Prior to the move to Wexford, Fawsitt began playing rugby with Greystones RFC at the age of seven. Fawsitt also played hurling and Gaelic football as a youth for St. Martin's GAA. Fawsitt attended Blackrock College and was a member of their 2009 rugby team that won the Leinster Schools Senior Cup in 2009. Fawsitt concluded his tenure with Greystones by competing at the first team level for three years through 2012. Fawsitt then played for St. Mary's College for two years in the All-Ireland League's Division 1A.

Move to the United States
In 2014, Fawsitt moved to the United States to attend Life University, where he earned a master's degree in exercise science. There he played and coached for the university's rugby teams. After playing with the Ohio Aviators (see section below), Fawsitt moved to New York where he played for Old Blue and serves as an Assistant Coach at Monroe College and Head Coach at Fordham Preparatory School.

Club career

Ohio Aviators
Fawsitt played for the Ohio Aviators in PRO Rugby's first and only season in 2016. Fawsitt made his debut for the Aviators on May 8, in the Aviators' 31–11 victory over Sacramento. He made his first start for the Aviators in a 24–20 defeat at San Diego on May 15. Fawsitt scored his first try for the Aviators on May 22, in the Aviators' 50–17 victory over Sacramento.

Rugby United New York
Fawsitt joined Rugby United New York for their inaugural season as an associate member of Major League Rugby in 2018. In 2018, Fawsitt served as the team's captain. Fawsitt scored his first try in a RUNY uniform in a March 25, 2018 exhibition against the Boston Mystics.

On September 19, 2018, RUNY announced that Fawsitt had re-signed with the New York side for the 2019 Major League Rugby season.

He returns to New york in 2019 MLR season, with a prominent participation, having in regular season 12 tries and 10 tries assist, qualifying RUNY in last game to playoffs for first time.

Glendale Raptors
Fawsitt joined Major League Rugby's Glendale Raptors for the 2018 regular season on loan from RUNY.

International career
Fawsitt made his debut with the USA Eagles on February 24, 2018, starting in the Eagles' 45–16 victory over Brazil in the 2018 Americas Rugby Championship. Fawsitt scored his first try for the Eagles in the Eagles' 61–19 victory over Uruguay on March 3, 2018.

International tries

References

1990 births
Living people
American rugby union players
Irish rugby union players
United States international rugby union players
Ohio Aviators players
American Raptors players
Rugby New York players
Rugby union hookers
Rugby union coaches
People educated at Blackrock College
Irish emigrants to the United States